The 2017–18 Arkansas Razorbacks men's basketball team represented the University of Arkansas in the 2017-18 NCAA Division I men's basketball season. The team was led by Mike Anderson, who was in his seventh season. The Razorbacks played their home games at Bud Walton Arena in Fayetteville, Arkansas as a member of the Southeastern Conference. They finished the season 23–12, 10–8 in SEC play to finish in a three-way tie for fourth place. As the No. 6 seed in the SEC tournament, they defeated South Carolina and Florida before losing in the semifinals to Tennessee. They received an at-large bid to the NCAA tournament where they lost in the first round to Butler.

Senior guard Jaylen Barford was named first-team All-SEC, while senior guard Daryl Macon was a second-team All-SEC selection. Freshman center Daniel Gafford was named to the SEC All-Freshman Team. On March 26, 2018, Gafford announced he would forgo the 2018 NBA draft and would be returning to Arkansas for his sophomore season.

Previous season
The Razorbacks finished the 2016–17 season 26–10, 12–6 in SEC play to finish in a tie for third. In the SEC tournament, the defeated Ole Miss and Vanderbilt before losing to Kentucky in the tournament championship. They received an at-large bid to the NCAA tournament for the second time in three years as a  #8 seed in the South region. There, they defeated #9 Seton Hall before falling to top seed and eventual national champion North Carolina in the round of 32.

Offseason

Departures

2017 recruiting class

2018 recruiting class

Roster

Schedule and results

|-
!colspan=12 style=| Exhibition

|-
!colspan=12 style=| Regular season

|-
!colspan=12 style=| SEC Tournament

|-
!colspan=12 style=| NCAA tournament

References

Arkansas Razorbacks men's basketball seasons
Arkansas
Razor
Razor
Arkansas